El Pájaro is a corregimiento in Pesé District, Herrera Province, Panama with a population of 861 as of 2010. Its population as of 1990 was 1,065; its population as of 2000 was 984.

References

Corregimientos of Herrera Province